Cytinus is a genus of parasitic flowering plants. Species in this genus do not produce chlorophyll, but rely fully on its host plant. Cytinus usually parasitizes Cistus and Halimium, two genera of plants in the family Cistaceae. It has also been found on Ptilostemon chamaepeuce.

Several species are found in the Mediterranean Region, South Africa, with a possibly undescribed species from Madagascar.

Biology 
C. capensis and C. sanguineus are dioecious, while C. hypocistis is monoecious.

C. hypocistis has been shown to infect mainly Halimium halimifolium and Cistus monspeliensis in Portugal.

Systematics 
The genus Cytinus was previously included in the parasitic family Rafflesiaceae, but is now put into the family Cytinaceae (order Malvales), together with the genus Bdallophytum with four species.

Cytinus ruber is no longer considered a separate species, but is now a subspecies of C. hypocistis.

Uses 

The young C. hypocistis is cooked as an asparagus substitute and an extract has been used in herbal medicine for dysentery, throat tumors and as an astringent. C. ruber is also edible and was used in folk medicine as an emmenagogue.

Species

Footnotes

References 
  (2010): 658. Cytinus ruber Cytinaceae. Bot. Mag. 26(4): 314–321.
  (2004): Phylogenetic inference in Rafflesiales: the influence of rate heterogeneity and horizontal gene transfer. BMC Evolutionary Biology 4: 40. 
  (2021): Cytinus under the microscope: disclosing the secrets of a parasitic plant. Plants.  (with link to full text PDF)
  (2007): Host Specificity in the Parasitic Plant Cytinus hypocistis. Research Letters in Ecology.  (with link to full text PDF)

Further reading 
  (2006): A new species of Cytinus (Cytinaceae) from South Africa and Swaziland, with a key to the Southern African species. Novon 16(3): 315–319. Abstract

External links 

 Cytinaceae References
 Pictures of type specimens from South Africa
Parasitic Plant Connection: Cytinaceae

Cytinaceae
Flora of Europe
Parasitic plants
Medicinal plants
Malvales genera